Zamojski may refer to:
an alternative spelling of Zamoyski, a surname and line of Polish nobles
Zamość County, Polish name powiat zamojski, an administrative division in eastern Poland
a type of cheese from Poland